is a manga artist who hails from Ōmuta, Fukuoka.  She contributed the art for Blood Sucker: Legend of Zipangu (2000), Graduale der Wolken (2001), and adapted a manga version of Suikoden III (2002) based on Konami's video game.  In 2003, she began Qwan, an original story of her own.

Bibliography
1995: Illustrator for PC Magazine Log In
1998: Package art and character designs for Windows game After Devil Force
1999: Character illustrations for Windows game First Queen: The New World
1999: Yato no Kamitsukai, published in Comic Birz (Art only)
2000: Kumo no Graduale, published in Monthly Comic Flapper (Art only)
2000: Legend of Zipangu: Blood Sucker (Twelve volumes), published in Comic Birz (Art only)
2001: Devil Children card game (Art only)
2001: Aquarian Age card game (Art only)
2002: Qwan (Seven volumes), published in Monthly Comic Flapper (Writer/artist)
2002: Suikoden III (Eleven volumes), published in Monthly Comic Flapper (Writer/artist)
2016: Graduale der Wolken

References

External links 

 
 
 Aki Shimizu at Media Arts Database 

Year of birth missing (living people)
People from Ōmuta, Fukuoka
Living people
Manga artists